Iain Hesford (4 March 1960 – 18 November 2014) was an English professional footballer. He played as a goalkeeper for teams including Blackpool, Eastern, Sunderland and South China.

Early career
Hesford began his career at Blackpool, where he played more than 200 games and won seven caps for the England Under-21 team. When he made his debut, against Oldham Athletic on 20 August 1977, aged 17, he became the youngest goalkeeper ever to play for Blackpool in a League game. As he ran out for the second half, he offended the Latics support by flashing them a "V" sign. In 1983, he was signed by Sheffield Wednesday, but didn't play a single game for the Owls. In 1986, he moved to Sunderland, where he played for two and a half seasons, before he moved to Hull City in December 1988, in a deal that saw Tony Norman move in the opposite direction. He was part of the Hull side that were relegated from the old Division 2 in 1991. He left the club, whereupon he signed for Maidstone United, who were also struggling at the time. He scored the winner in a 3–2 home win for Maidstone against Hereford United on a windy day in 1991, with a massive drop-kick from his own penalty area.

Career in Hong Kong
Hesford's career in Hong Kong started in July 1992 when he joined Eastern. He played for the club for 4 years before he moved to Sing Tao in 1996–97 season and later South China in 1997–98. During his time at Eastern, the club captured 5 trophies including the Hong Kong Senior Shield, FA Cup and the league championship. He was elected as the best foreign player in the league in 1992. He was also in the HKFDL Team of the Year for three seasons (1992–93, 1993–94 and 1994–95). While at Eastern, he went 827 minutes (over ten games) without conceding a goal, setting a HKFDL record before Loh Wai Chi scored for South China in a second round match.

He played for Hong Kong XI ('Hong Kong Golden Select') against England in a friendly which the visitors won 1–0.

He left Hong Kong in 1998 and started his career as a coach in England. He ran a hotel in Littleborough, near Rochdale, Greater Manchester, England.

Death
On 20 November 2014, the body of Hesford was discovered. The local newspaper, the Blackpool Gazette, noted a "suspected heart attack."

References

External links
 HKFA website (in Chinese) 聯賽不失球紀錄的保持者─希福特
 

1960 births
2014 deaths
People from Ndola
Zambian people of British descent
Zambian people of English descent
Zambian emigrants to the United Kingdom
White Zambian people
Sing Tao SC players
Blackpool F.C. players
England under-21 international footballers
English expatriate footballers
English footballers
English people of Zambian descent
Expatriate footballers in Hong Kong
Association football goalkeepers
Fulham F.C. players
Hong Kong First Division League players
Hull City A.F.C. players
Maidstone United F.C. (1897) players
Notts County F.C. players
Sheffield Wednesday F.C. players
South China AA players
Eastern Sports Club footballers
Sunderland A.F.C. players
People from Littleborough, Greater Manchester
English expatriate sportspeople in Hong Kong